Fuerza is the Latin Grammy nominated twelfth studio album released by Mexican singer Alejandra Guzmán. It was released on November 26, 2007. The first single released was "Soy Sólo Un Secreto".

Album history
According to bloggarte.com the album was supposed to be released on December 4, 2007 but it was ultimately changed for a November release. About the track "Hasta el Final" ("Until the End") was written by the singer herself after a breast cancer operation, and is dedicated to her daughter Frida Sofía. "I wrote it for my daughter at the hospital, it's a very pretty song about hope, faith, not looking back, don't stop loving and the things I am feeling".
In the album will be rock, ballad and guzmanism!!. Some tracks included are: "Todo", "Por un Momento", "Bellísima", "Un Buen Día" and "Diosa Seducción".

The album is produced once again by Loris Ceroni (who produced before artists like Fey, Natalia Lafourcade and Laura Pausini. 13 tracks were selected including songs written by José Luis Pagán, Mario Domm and the singer herself. The album was released in Mexico and Latinamerica and later in the United States and Spain.

On September 10, 2008 this album received a Latin Grammy nomination for Best Female Pop Vocal Performance, but lost to Cualquier Día by Kany García.

In 2008, Fuerza was released by Sony BMG in Spain like a compilation album with a different track list.

Track listing

Standard edition 
"Por Un Momento" (Mario Domm, Alejandra Guzmán) 
"Soy Sólo Un Secreto" (Alejandra Guzmán, José Luis Pagán)
"Hasta el Final" (Mario Domm, Alejandra Guzmán)
"Todo" (Oscar Schwebel, Francesco de Bendetti, Davide Esposito, Maximiliano Corona)
"Nada es Como Es" (Alejandra Guzmán, Cristian Zalles)
"Mírame" (Salvador Rizzo, Jaime Ciero)
"Quiero Ser" (Alejandra Guzmán, Karenka, Gianluigi Fazio)
"Un Buen Día" (Reyli Barba, Rafael Esparza)
"Bellísima" (Alejandra Guzmán, Oscar Schwebel)
"Diosa Seducción" (Cocetta Constanzo)
"Siempre Tú (Dark Side of the Moon)" (Linda Perry, Goapele Mohlabanne, Alejandra Guzmán, José Luis Pagán)
"Hasta el Final" (Acustic) (Mario Domm, Alejandra Guzmán)

Spanish edition 
"Soy Sólo Un Secreto" (Alejandra Guzmán, José Luis Pagán)
"Hasta El Final" (Mario Domm, Alejandra Guzmán)
"Diablo" (Alejandra Guzmán, Jordi Marr, Randy Cantor)
"Volverte A Amar" (Alejandra Guzmán, Mario Domm)
"Toda La Mitad" (Pancho Varona, F. Bastante, Antonio G. de Diego)
"Loca" (Myra Stella Turner)
"Guerra Fría" (Carlos A. Dávila, Juan Antonio Castillo)
"Necesito Amarme" (Mario Domm, Alejandra Guzmán)
"De Verdad" (Julia Sierra, Jordi Marr, Steve Mandile)
"Quiero Estar Contigo" (Mario Domm, Alejandra Guzmán)
"Lipstick" (Ernest Newsky, Lisa Greene, NC Thanh, R. Russell, Storm Lee)
"Tú Eres Mi Luz" (Loris Ceroni, Ettore Grenci)
"La Plaga" (Blackwell, Marascalco)

Singles

Chart performance
The album debuted at number 13 on the Mexican Top 100 by AMPROFON, climbing to number 12 and later to number 8 in the week from December 10–16, 2007, and in United States debuted at number 53 on the Billboard Top Latin Albums and at number 37 on the Top Heatseekers survey.

Charts

Sales and certifications

Personnel
Producer: Loris Ceroni
Co-Producer: Alejandra Guzmán
Recorder and mixer: Loris Ceroni at Le Dune Recording Studio, Riolo Terme, Italy
Mastering: Mike Marsh at The Exchange Mastering, London
Photography: Enrique Covarrubias
Design: micro www.unmirador.com

Musicians
Drums: Cristiano Micalizzi and Diego Sapignoli
Percussion and bass: Loris Ceroni
Guitars and accordion: Dario Giovanini
Piano and string arrangements : Mario Neri
Background vocals: Emanuela Cortesi, Gigi Fazio, Conceta Constanzo

References

Alejandra Guzmán albums
2007 albums